Natali Shaheen is a Palestinian international footballer.

External links 
 

Living people
Palestinian footballers
Palestine international footballers
Association football midfielders
Year of birth missing (living people)